The Monster Who Ate Jesus is the first studio album of Indianapolis Christian horror punk band Blaster the Rocket Man under Jackson Rubio Records, released August 10, 1999. Though technically the band's first album, the group has put out two previous records under a different name, Blaster the Rocketboy, and with a different label, Boot to Head Records.


Track listing

Themes
Christian themes and allegories are predominant throughout the album, including songs like "I Like Lycanthropy" (with lyrics such as, "You gotta die, die, die with Jesus to know the Resurrection") and "Baby Unvamp (is Making a Comeback)," featuring the lyrics, "But now we are the Bride of Jesus Christ."

Another common theme in the album is C.S. Lewis's Space Trilogy, a series of science fiction novels. The song "Ransom vs. the Unman" details the battle of Dr. Ransom and the Unman, characters of the Space Trilogy, which is featured in That Hideous Strength, the third book of the series. "Tundra Time on Thulcandra" uses various terms found throughout the trilogy, also.

Several of the songs deal with mythical creatures such as werewolves ("I Like Lycanthropy") and Frankenstein's monster ("Frankenstein's Monster Wants a Wife").

Personnel 
 Otto Bot (Daniel Petersen) - lead vocals
 Heater Hands (Dave Petersen) - guitars, drums, organ, vocals
 Oxford Don - bass

References
 

1995 albums
Blaster the Rocket Man albums